Koji Yamasaki (山﨑 浩司, born October 31, 1980) is a Japanese professional baseball infielder for the Tohoku Rakuten Golden Eagles in Japan's Nippon Professional Baseball.

External links

NPB.com

1980 births
Living people
Baseball people from Osaka
Japanese baseball players
Nippon Professional Baseball infielders
Osaka Kintetsu Buffaloes players
Hiroshima Toyo Carp players
Orix Buffaloes players
Saitama Seibu Lions players
Tohoku Rakuten Golden Eagles players